Ello is a municipality in the Province of Lecco in the Italian region Lombardy.

Ello may also refer to:

Ello Creation System, construction toy
Ello (social network)
Peeter Ello (1955 –  1997), Estonian politician
Ello, a transliteration variant of the name of the Korean singer Elo

See also
Erinnyis ello, a moth